Ella A. Thomas (born 1981) is an Eritrean American actress, model and producer.

Biography 
Thomas was born to an Eritrean mother from Asmara and an American Air Force officer, who was stationed in Eritrea.

When she was still a child, Thomas' family relocated to Germany, where they lived in the small town of Kindsbach. There, she attended a local German school. Thomas also studied French, while simultaneously continuing Tigrinya and English lessons at home with her mother. Around this time, Thomas first developed an appreciation for the performing arts, and began taking part in local school and theater productions. She likewise would periodically return home to Asmara to visit relatives.

Thomas has guest starred as Agent Deborah Meade on CSI: NY and played one of the lead characters, Anna Roberts, in The Storm miniseries on NBC. In the fall 2009, she appeared opposite Bruce Willis in the Touchstone/Disney sci-fi thriller Surrogates, which opened September 25, 2009.

One of her most recognizable performances was as Viveca, a model who attempts to seduce Vince (played by Adrian Grenier), on the HBO hit Entourage and as P Diddy's fiancée Nadine Alcott on CSI: Miami.

Thomas also starred on the breakout series Parenthood opposite Monica Potter and Peter Krause as well as the ABC's hit show Castle.

Thomas has a recurring role on NCIS: Los Angeles and returned to the show in the fall of 2015 as the character Jada Khaled. Thomas guest starred in the episode "Skin" of the Karl Urban and Michael Ealy helmed FOX series Almost Human. She was seen opposite Zoe Saldana as the author Lorraine Hansberry in the Nina Simone biopic, Nina, which was released April 22, 2016.

More recently she filmed one of the lead roles in the Hallmark Movie Channel film production Portrait of Love with Francis Fisher as well as recurring on the new HBO series Ballers alongside Dwayne Johnson and John David Washington.

Ella has also been featured in editorial spreads for American Vogue and Glamour and ELLE and she has also appeared in print ads for companies such as Gap, Tiffany & Co., and Levi's and is appearing in the Lexus ES automotive commercials. She completed a recurring arc on season 4 of ABC's  Mistresses as well as Antoine Fuqua's series for DirectTV Ice in the role of Lala Agabaria. She starred opposite Kyra Sedgwick in the ABC series Ten Days in the Valley as Detective Isabel Knight and appeared in the CBS series Me, Myself & I. She has also guest starred on Supergirl and The Detour.

Filmography

Film

Television

Other works

References

External links 

 
 

American television actresses
American film actresses
Living people
People from Asmara
Eritrean emigrants to the United States
American people of Eritrean descent
1981 births
People from Kaiserslautern (district)
21st-century American women